This is a list of number one pop singles on the Billboard Brasil Hot Pop chart in 2009.

Chart history

See also
Billboard Brasil
List of Hot 100 number-one singles of 2010 (Brazil)
Crowley Broadcast Analysis

Brazil
2010 Pop